The Wizard of Oz is a 1990 animated television series produced by DIC Animation City to capitalize on the popularity of the 1939 film version, to which DiC had acquired the rights from Turner Entertainment, Co. The series aired for thirteen episodes and premiered on ABC, starting on September 8, 1990. The show presented a number of stories and characters from L. Frank Baum's original Oz series. 

Author Jeff Lenburg mentioned an aspect of the series wherein Dorothy has to learn to believe in herself.

Plot
Dorothy has decided to return to Oz with Toto using the ruby slippers that showed up on her doorstep. Upon arriving there, she reunites with Scarecrow, Tin Man, and Cowardly Lion. Dorothy learns from Glinda that the Wicked Witch of the West has been resurrected by Truckle and his fellow winged monkeys. With the Wicked Witch of the West back from the dead, the Emerald City has been taken over by her and she has stolen the gifts that were given to Scarecrow, Tin Man, and Cowardly Lion. The Wizard is in his hot air balloon, which is under a spell that causes it to be constantly blown around by an evil wind. Dorothy, Toto, Scarecrow, Tin Man, and Cowardly Lion set out to rescue him and defeat the Wicked Witch once and for all.

Comparison with source material
The series incorporated music and visual elements from the 1939 film version, including the Scarecrow's diploma and Dorothy's ruby slippers. At the same time, the character of Dorothy was designed with an appearance similar to that of Princess Ariel from Disney's The Little Mermaid and was not intended to resemble Judy Garland.

Episodes

Principal voice actors
 Liz Georges – Dorothy Gale
 David Lodge – Scarecrow
 Hal Rayle – Tin Man
 Charlie Adler – Cowardly Lion
 Frank Welker – Toto, Hyena (ep. 6)
 Tress MacNeille – Wicked Witch of the West, Miranda (ep. 10)
 B.J. Ward – Glinda
 Alan Oppenheimer – Wizard of Oz

Additional voices
 Jack Angel –
 Hamilton Camp –
 Pat Fraley – Truckle the Winged Monkey
 Bibi Osterwald –
 Rob Paulsen –
 Ken Sansom –
 Susan Silo – Munchkin Mayor (ep. 1)

Crew
 Susan Blu – Voice Director
 Ginny McSwain – Casting Director

International and re-airings
After its run on ABC, the series reaired on Syndication on Bohbot Entertainment's Amazin' Adventures block from 1992 until 1993. The series also reaired on Toon Disney from the channel's launch in 1998 until 2002. The series also reaired on HBO.

In Canada, the series aired on YTV from 1990 to 1995.

Home media

United States
"The Marvelous Milkmaid of Mechanica" has never been released in the United States in any home video format. "The Lion that Squeaked" is available only on VHS.

International

United Kingdom

See also
 Adaptations of The Wizard of Oz

References

External links
 

1990s American animated television series
1990 American television series debuts
1990 American television series endings
American Broadcasting Company original programming
The Wizard of Oz (1939 film)
Animated television shows based on films
Animated television series based on The Wizard of Oz
American television shows based on children's books
Television series by DIC Entertainment
Television about magic
Witchcraft in television
Wizards in television
American children's animated adventure television series
American children's animated fantasy television series
Television series based on adaptations
Animated television series about orphans
Animated television series about dogs
Animated television series about lions